LRS may refer to:

Science and technology
 Lactated Ringer's solution, used for intravenous administration
 Learning Record Store, a data store system
 Linear recursive sequence, a recurrence relation used in mathematics
 Linear reference system, a method of spatial referencing along a line
 Limited Rate Support, a Wi-Fi mode; see IEEE 802.11g-2003

Organisations
 Levi, Ray & Shoup, a business consulting firm
  (Lithuanian Russian Union), a political party in Lithuania
 Liverpool Reform Synagogue, a Reform Jewish synagogue in Liverpool, England
 London River Services, a division of Transport for London
 Long-range surveillance, a unit of the United States Army

Other uses
 , a Venezuelan broadcasting law
 Leros Municipal Airport (IATA code), on an island of Greece
 Location Referencing System, used for state-owned roads in Pennsylvania, US
 LRS (TV station)